Fish Springs may refer to a location in the United States:

 Fish Springs, California
 Fish Springs, Nevada
 Fish Springs, Tennessee
 Fish Springs National Wildlife Refuge, Utah
 Fish Springs Range, Utah
 Fish Springs, Utah